The Shenjiying, which directly translates to "Divine Machine Battalion", was one of Ming dynasty's three elite military divisions stationed around Beijing collectively called the "Three Big Battalions", and was famous for its utilization of firearm weaponries. Its name has also been variously rendered as Firearms Division, Artillery Camp, Shen-chi Camp and Firearm Brigade.

Established during the reign of the Yongle Emperor (1360–1424), the Divine Machine Battalion was specifically created to specialize in firearm warfare. Later on the division provided half of Qi Jiguang's army with firearms and one cannon to every twelve soldiers.

The other two elite brethren divisions around the capital were the Five Barracks Battalion, which drilled infantry in tactical manoeuvres; and the Three Thousand Battalion, which specialized in reconnaissance, mounted combat and signalling. Firearms equipped included the fire lance, fire arrows, volley guns, cannons and matchlock guns such as the arquebus.

During the Qing dynasty (1644–1912), which succeeded the Ming dynasty, there was also a military unit called Shenjiying but was known in English as the Peking Field Force. It was created in 1862 during the reign of Tongzhi Emperor and put in charge of protecting the Forbidden City.

References 

Military history of the Ming dynasty
14th century in China
14th-century conflicts
Military units and formations of the Ming Dynasty
Divisions of China
Chinese warriors